Spy Fox in "Dry Cereal" is the first of three games in the Spy Fox series developed by Humongous Entertainment and marketed by Atari. The game was ported to the Wii in 2008, utilizing the Wii Remote for point-and-click controls, but it only became available for a limited time due to legal problems concerning the port's development. In 2012, Nimbus Games Inc. released a version designed for both iOS and Android. A Nintendo Switch version was released on February 10, 2022, followed by the PlayStation 4 version on the PlayStation Store in November. The game has 2 million copies sold and received 20 Awards of Excellence.

Plot
The game takes place on the fictional island of Acidophilus in Greece. William the Kid, the CEO of the Nectar of the Goats (N.O.G.) Corporation, plots to rid the world of cow's milk so that he can take control of the dairy world with his "delicious" goat by-products. Spy Fox, who is flying to the island from an airplane, is assigned to find Mr. Howard Hugh Heifer Udderly III, the president and CEO of Amalgamated Moo Juice Incorporated, the only one who knows of Kid's schemes. Monkey Penny gives Spy Fox a photo of Mr. Udderly's behind to help find him.

After Spy Fox rescues Mr. Udderly from being tied up over a pool of piranhas in a feta factory, the latter explains Kid's entire plan: to kidnap all of the dairy cows in the world, gather all of the dairy milk in the world in a giant milk carton called the Milky Weapon of Destruction, flood the capital with all that milk, frame the dairy cows for that crime, get them all thrown in "cow jail", and eventually take over the dairy world. Udderly then states that he swiped the code that can turn the Milky Weapon of Destruction off, but also admits that he swallowed it so it wouldn't be discovered. Fortunately, Fox is able to use an "X'-Ray Gum" gadget made by Professor Quack to see the code inside Udderly's stomach and sets out to find the missing part to it as well as find a way to enter William the Kid's secret fortress.

Spy Fox manages to enter the fortress but is stopped by a scanner due to not having a proper uniform. However, he is able to get in after he snatches a yellow jumpsuit, which is the N.O.G uniform. Shortly after entering, Fox witnesses William the Kid giving Russian Blue, his right-hand woman the missing part to the Milky Weapon's deactivator and telling her to hide it somewhere safe. After Spy Fox finds and uses the missing piece to disarm the Milky Weapon of Destruction, William the Kid decides to drown the dairy cows in the milk. After getting through a secret passageway (thanks to Kid's ascot getting stuck in the door), Fox frees the cows, but William the Kid (in his giant "getaway blimp") declares that he will return.

In a bonus ending, Spy Fox manages to sneak on Kid's blimp and set up Kid's ejection, so he lands in Spy Jail. When William the Kid lands in prison, he vows to escape from jail someday for revenge, although he soon resigns to his fate. Later, the President awards Spy Fox with the "Big Daddy Congressional Cookie of Justice", to which Fox says, "I got my cookie, has anyone got milk?"

Gameplay
The Spy Fox adventures retain the easy-to-use format of the other Humongous computer games, but unlike the others, the Spy Fox series introduces talk balloons. Talk balloons enable Spy Fox to ask any character a specific question instead of simply having an ordinary conversation. Monkey Penny and Quack offer Spy Fox a number of gadgets to make use of. Like other Humongous titles, Spy Fox offers minigames within the game. The Spy Fox games have multiple narratives; the story branches into a small number of threads midway through the game, and which thread the story follows is randomly selected each playthrough.

Reception
Spy Fox in "Dry Cereal" received mixed to positive reviews from various critics. GameRankings gave 80% for the PC version and 55% for the Wii version, both based on 1 review, IGN gave a great 8.4 out of 10 score for the PC version, Adventure Gamers gave a 4-star rating, Allgame gave a 4.5-star rating and Unikgamer gave a 7.9 out 10 score.

References

External links
 
 Spy Fox in "Dry Cereal" at Humongous Entertainment

1997 video games
Adventure games
Android (operating system) games
Atari games
Children's educational video games
Classic Mac OS games
IOS games
Linux games
Majesco Entertainment games
Nintendo Switch games
Point-and-click adventure games
ScummVM-supported games
Single-player video games
Spy Fox
Video games about foxes
Video games developed in the United States
Video games scored by Jeremy Soule
Video games set in Greece
Wii games
Windows games
Tommo games
UFO Interactive Games games
Video games with alternate endings